Guido Virgilio Alvarenga Morales (born 24 August 1970, in Asunción) is a retired football (soccer) player from Paraguay, who was nicknamed "El Mago". He played as an attacking midfielder during his career.

International
Alvarenga made his international début for the Paraguay national football team on 14 June 1995 in a friendly match against Argentina (2-1 loss). He obtained a total number of 25 international caps, scoring three goals for the national side  and was a participant at the 1992 Summer Olympics and at the 2002 FIFA World Cup.

Club statistics

National team statistics

Honours

Club
 Olimpia Asunción
 Recopa Sudamericana: 2003

References

External links
 playerhistory
 

 

Living people
1970 births
Club Universitario de Deportes footballers
Paraguayan footballers
Paraguayan expatriate footballers
Club Atlético Banfield footballers
Expatriate footballers in Argentina
Expatriate footballers in Mexico
Expatriate footballers in Peru
Cerro Porteño players
Club Olimpia footballers
Deportivo Mandiyú footballers
Kawasaki Frontale players
Expatriate footballers in Japan
Paraguayan Primera División players
Liga MX players
J1 League players
Club León footballers
Club Libertad footballers
Paraguay international footballers
2002 FIFA World Cup players
Olympic footballers of Paraguay
Footballers at the 1992 Summer Olympics
1991 Copa América players
1999 Copa América players
2001 Copa América players
Sportspeople from Asunción
Association football midfielders